Suyargulovo (Höyärğol) is a rural locality (a village) in Novobayramgulovsky Selsoviet, Uchalinsky District, Bashkortostan, Russia. The population was 90 as of 2010. There are 3 streets.

Geography 
Suyargulovo is located 50 km southwest of Uchaly (the district's administrative centre) by road. Kaluyevo is the nearest rural locality.

References 

Rural localities in Uchalinsky District